Byrathi Basavaraj is an Indian politician who is the current Minister of Urban (excluding Bengaluru) Development of Karnataka  from 4 August 2021. He started social service and entered politics and became panchayat member and president. He became corporator for Hoodi ward in 2009 and contested Krishnarajapuram Vidhanasabha constituency (K R Puram) in 2013 and became MLA for the first time from congress. He became second time MLA in 2018 general elections from congress. In 2019 after his resignation, he contested from BJP in by election and won with a huge margin. Later he became minister for Urban Development in B S Yediyurappa cabinet and second term minister in Basavaraj Bommai cabinet.

He was elected to the Karnataka Legislative Assembly from Krishnarajapuram in the 2013 and 2018 Karnataka Legislative Assembly election as a member of the Indian National Congress. Byrathi Basavaraj took oath as Urban Development Minister in the presence of Chief Minister Basavaraj Bommai at Raj Bhavan, Bengaluru on August 4, 2021..

References

1964 births
Living people
Bharatiya Janata Party politicians from Karnataka
Indian National Congress politicians from Karnataka
People from Bangalore
Karnataka MLAs 2018–2023